Alonso de Covarrubias (Torrijos, Toledo 1488–1570) was a Spanish architect and sculptor of the Renaissance, active mainly in Toledo.

Works
Covarrubias' works include:

His first work was associated with Antón Egas and Juan Guas, in a style the transition between late gothic and Plateresque. In the first years of his career he worked principally as a sculptor.

First works as architect:
At Sigüenza Cathedral, he is credited with designing the retables of Saint Librada and Fadrique de Portugal,  influenced by Francisco de Baeza (1515).
 In the Hospital de Santa Cruz (Toledo): the courtyard and the plateresque stairway.
 In 1532 worked in the sacristy of Sigüenza Cathedral.

In Toledo:
In 1534 he was named superintendent of the building program at Toledo Cathedral where he planned the New Kings chapel.
In 1537 Covarrubias and Luis de Vega were named architects of the  Alcázar. Covarrubias built the main façade and the courtyard.  
 (1541-   ) Designed and built the Tavera Hospital (Hospital de Tavera), one of his principal buildings.
154_ The façade of Episcopal palace of Toledo
Rebuilt the Puerta de Bisagra Nueva.

Other important Works:
In the 1530s built the cloister of the Lupiana Monastery.
He also worked in the Archbishop's Palace of Alcalá de Henares where he built the façade and the lost courtyard.

Gallery

Sources
 

Spanish architects
Renaissance architects
1488 births
1570 deaths
16th-century Spanish architects